Sir Reginald Crawford (died 17 February 1307) was a Scottish knight who took part in the Wars of Scottish Independence.

In 1296 he was appointed as Sheriff of Ayr by the English administration.  In June 1297 he was one of several Scots nobles who did a deal where they were released by the English to fight against Andrew Moray.  This suggests that he may have taken  part in the revolt in early 1297 which ended in the capitulation at Irvine. 
 
He became a supporter of Robert the Bruce and was captured during the Battle of Loch Ryan in February 1307. He was executed by hanging in Carlisle, England.

He may have been related to the Ronald Crawford who was hanged at the Barns of Ayr, but this issue is surrounded by uncertainty and later legend.

References

History of the Shire of Renfrew, George Crawfurd, Glasgow, 1710.
The Life and Heroick Actions of the Renoun'd Sir William Wallace, General and Governor of Scotland, Blind Harry (Blin Hary or Henry the Minstrel), original personal manuscript, c. 1475. 
Blind Harry's Wallace,  William Hamilton of Gilbertfield, original publication 1722, Luath Press, Edinburgh, 1998, .

1307 deaths
Scottish people of the Wars of Scottish Independence
Executed Scottish people
People executed under the Plantagenets
People from Ayrshire
Scottish sheriffs
13th-century Scottish judges
Scottish knights
Reginald
14th-century Scottish judges